Glenn Medeiros is the self-titled debut album by American singer Glenn Medeiros, released in 1987. The album includes his cover version of George Benson's "Nothing's Gonna Change My Love for You", which was a massive worldwide hit, reaching #12 on the Billboard Hot 100 and spent four weeks at number one on the UK Singles Chart in July 1988.

Track listing

Personnel
Glenn Medeiros – lead & backing vocals
"Reverend" Dave Boruff – synthesizers, saxophone
Michael Brady – bass
Jeff Gilhart – guitars
Jay Gruska – keyboards, synthesizers
John Keane – drums, percussion
Tom Keane – keyboards
Michael London – bass
Leeza Miller – backing vocals
Bob Parr – synthesizer
John Pierce – bass
Ken Rarick – synthesizers, keyboards
Arranged by Jay Gruska, Jay A. Ryan, John Ryan & Jay Stone
Vocal arrangements by Michael Brady & Tom Keane

Production
Produced by Jay Stone
Executive producer: Leonard Silver
Engineering: Doug Carleton, Greg Scott, Jeffrey Woodruff
Assistant engineers: Doug Carleton, Greg Scott
Mixing: Jeff Tyzik
Mastering: Bernie Grundman

Charts

References

1987 debut albums
Glenn Medeiros albums